A penumbral lunar eclipse took place on Sunday, March 12, 1933. This very subtle penumbral eclipse was essentially invisible to the naked eye; though it lasted 3 hours and 26 minutes, just 59% of the Moon's disc was in partial shadow (with no part of it in complete shadow).

Visibility

Member
This is the 19th member of Lunar Saros 141. The next event is the March 1951 lunar eclipse.

Related lunar eclipses

Saros series 

Lunar Saros 141, repeating every 18 years and 11 days, has a total of 72 lunar eclipse events including 26 total lunar eclipses.

First Penumbral Lunar Eclipse: 1608 Aug 25

First Partial Lunar Eclipse: 2041 May 16

First Total Lunar Eclipse: 2167 Aug 01

First Central Lunar Eclipse: 2221 Sep 02

Greatest Eclipse of the Lunar Saros 141: 2293 Oct 16

Last Central Lunar Eclipse: 2546 Mar 18

Last Total Lunar Eclipse: 2618 May 01

Last Partial Lunar Eclipse: 2744 Jul 16

Last Penumbral Lunar Eclipse: 2888 Oct 11

1901-2100

March 1915 lunar eclipse

March 1933 lunar eclipse

March 1951 lunar eclipse

April 1969 lunar eclipse

April 1987 lunar eclipse

April 2005 lunar eclipse

May 2023 lunar eclipse

May 2041 lunar eclipse

May 2059 lunar eclipse

June 2077 lunar eclipse

June 2095 lunar eclipse

See also
List of lunar eclipses
List of 20th-century lunar eclipses

Notes

External links

1933-03
1933 in science